Same is one of the seven districts of the Kilimanjaro Region of Tanzania.  It is bordered to the north by the Mwanga District, to the northeast by Kenya, to the south and southeast by the Korogwe District and Lushoto District of Tanga Region, and to the west by Simanjiro District of Manyara Region. The district capital is the town of Same, Tanzania. The south Pare Mountains are located within the district's boundaries and so is a part of Mkomazi National Park.
According to the 2002 Tanzania National Census, the population of the Same District was 212,235.  The population had risen to 269,807 according to the 2012 Tanzania National Census.

Geography
The tallest point being Shengena Peak at 2, 463m. The district is home to Mkomazi National Park, and a few other protected areas such as Chome Forest Reserve which is home to the South Pare white-eye, an endemic bird found only the district.

Economy
Paved Trunk road T2 from Dar es Salaam to Arusha passes through the Same District, thus making the road an important economic boost for the district bringing goods and services to the district. The district's main income source is agriculture, for both commercial and subsistence needs. Commercial agricultural products in Same are Sisal. However tourisms is slowly becoming a source of foreign exchange with the popularity of Mkomazi national Park and the Chome Forest Reserve. The Usambara Railway from Tanga to Arusha passes through the district as well.

Administrative subdivisions

Wards
As of 2012, the Same District is administratively divided into 31 wards:

 Bangalala
 Bombo
 Bendera
 Bwambo
 Chome
 Hedaru
 Mabilion
 Kihurio
 Kirangare
 Kisiwani 
 Makanya

 Maore
 Mhezi
 Mpinji
 Mshewa
 Msindo
 Mtii
 Mwembe 
 Myamba
 Ndungu
 Kalemawe

 Njoro
 Vumari
 Ruvu
 Same
 Kisima
 Steshen
 Suji
 Vudee
 Vuje
 Vunta
 Lugulu

External links
 Same Profile, Kilimanjaro Region website
 
 Same District, Kilimajaro Area unofficial page which appears to have some official content
 Tanganyika history

References

Districts of Kilimanjaro Region